The 1980 VMI Keydets football team was an American football team that represented the Virginia Military Institute (VMI) as a member of the Southern Conference (SoCon) during the 1980 NCAA Division I-A football season. In their tenth year under head coach Bob Thalman, the team compiled an overall record of 3–7–1 with a mark of 1–4–1 in conference play, placing sixth in the SoCon.

Schedule

References

VMI
VMI Keydets football seasons
VMI Keydets football